White Fulani cattle are an important beef breed of cattle throughout the area conquered by the Fulani people and beyond in the Sahel zone of Africa.  They are mostly Zebu but of Sanga cattle origin.  Characterized by high lyre shaped horns, they have either thoracic humps like the Zebu or humps intermediate with the cervico-thoracic humps of the Sanga.

The White Fulani and Red Fulani breeds are quite separate, both in origin and in locations where they are kept.

References

Cattle breeds